Vanda, abbreviated in the horticultural trade as V., is a genus in the orchid family, Orchidaceae. There are about 87 species, and the genus is commonly cultivated for the marketplace. This genus and its allies are considered to be among the most specifically adapted of all orchids within the Orchidaceae. The genus is highly prized in horticulture for its showy, fragrant, long-lasting, and intensely colorful flowers. Vanda species are widespread across East Asia, Southeast Asia, and New Guinea, with a few species extending into Queensland and some of the islands of the western Pacific.

Etymology 
The name "Vanda" is derived from the Sanskrit (वन्दाका) name for the species Vanda roxburghii (a synonym of Vanda tessellata).

Distribution
These mostly epiphytic, but sometimes lithophytic or terrestrial orchids, are distributed in India, Himalaya, Southeast Asia, Indonesia, the Philippines, New Guinea, southern China, and northern Australia.

Description
The genus has a monopodial growth habit with flat, typically broad, ovoid leaves (strap-leaves). Species with cylindrical (terete), fleshy leaves, which are adapted to dry periods were transferred to the genus Papilionanthe. The stems of these orchids vary considerably in size; some are miniature plants and some have a length of several meters. The plants can become quite massive in habitat and in cultivation, and epiphytic species possess very large, rambling aerial root systems. The roots have pneumatodes.

The few to many flattened flowers grow on a lateral inflorescence. Most show a yellow-brown color with brown markings, but they also appear in white, green, orange, red, and burgundy shades. The lip has a small spur. Vanda species usually bloom every few months and the flowers last for two to three weeks.

Ecology

Pollination
Vanda falcata has been reported to be pollinated by several hawkmoth species of the genus Theretra, namely Theretra japonica and Theretra nessus.

Conservation
Many Vanda orchids (especially V. coerulea) are endangered, and have never been common because they are usually only infrequently encountered in habitat and grow only in disturbed forest areas with high light levels, and are severely threatened and vulnerable to habitat destruction. The export of wild-collected specimens of the blue orchid (V. coerulea) and other wild Vanda species is prohibited worldwide, as all orchids are listed on Appendix II of the Convention on International Trade in Endangered Species.

Cultivation 
This genus is one of the five most horticulturally important orchid genera, because it has some of the most magnificent flowers to be found in the orchid family. This has contributed much to the work of hybridists producing flowers for the cut flower market. V. coerulea is one of the few botanical orchids which can produce varieties with blue flowers (actually a very bluish purple), a property much appreciated for producing interspecific and intergeneric hybrids.

The color blue is rare among orchids, and only Thelymitra crinita, a terrestrial species from Australia, produces flowers that are truly "blue" among the orchids, the other being Aganisia cyanea, a lowland species from northern South America that is difficult to cultivate, but has metallic blue flowers. Both of these species, much like Vanda, also have a bluish-purple tint towards the inner petals of the flowers.

Vanda dearei is one of the chief sources of yellow color in Vanda hybrids. 

The plants do not possess pseudobulbs, but do possess leathery, drought-resistant leaves. Almost all of the species in this genus are very large epiphytes found in disturbed areas in habitat and prefer very high light levels, the plants having large root systems. Some of these species have a monopodial vine-like growth habit, and the plants can quickly become quite massive.

These plants prefer consistent conditions day-to-day in cultivation to avoid dropping their bottom leaves. The epiphytic species are best accommodated in large wooden baskets, bare rooted, which allows for the large aerial root systems. Disturbing or damaging the roots of large, mature vandaceous orchid plants, and in particular, Vanda and Aerides species, can result in the plants failing to flower and going into decline for a season or more. These plants do not tolerate disturbance or damage of their root systems in cultivation when they become mature. The terete-leaved terrestrial species are very easy to cultivate.

When grown bare-rooted, the epiphytic species require daily watering and weekly feeding and are very heavy feeders in cultivation. They can be grown out-of-doors in Hawaii and the like provided they are given some shade.

Fungal infections

Unfortunately fungal infections are not uncommon in cultivated plants. A variety of phytopathogens may infect Vanda orchids. Vandas may be affected by Fusarium wilt. This disease is characterized by purple discolouration in the vascular tissue, which results in the loss of their function. The hyphae and spores block the conductor vessels. Affected plants may superficially appear healthy, as they continue to grow, the oldest parts of the plants can be affected and the disease will eventually progress throughout the entire plant. If cutting tools are not sterilized the infection may spread to other plants.

Systematics 
In a recent molecular study of the genus Vanda , several Genera including the former Genus Ascocentrum, Neofinetia and Euanthe were brought into synonym with Vanda.

Species 
The following is a list of Vanda species recognised by Plants of the World Online as of January 2023: 

 
Vanda aliceae Motes, L.M.Gardiner & D.L.Roberts
Vanda alpina (Lindl.) Lindl. (Himalaya to China - S. Yunnan)
Vanda × amoena O'Brien
Vanda ampullacea (Roxb.) L.M.Gardiner
Vanda arbuthnotiana Kraenzl. (India)
Vanda arcuata J.J.Sm. (Indonesia - Sulawesi)
Vanda aurantiaca (Schltr.) L.M.Gardiner
Vanda aurantiaca subsp. aurantiaca
Vanda aurantiaca subsp. philippinensis
Vanda aurea (J.J.Sm.) L.M.Gardiner
Vanda barnesii W.E.Higgins & Motes (North Luzon, Philippines)
Vanda bensonii Bateman (Assam to Thailand)
Vanda bicolor Griff. (Bhutan)
Vanda bidupensis Aver. & Christenson (Vietnam)
Vanda × boumaniae J.J.Sm.
Vanda brunnea Rchb.f. (China - Yunnan to Indo-China)
Vanda celebica Rolfe (Indonesia – Sulawesi)
Vanda × charlesworthii Rolfe
Vanda chirayupiniae Wannakr.
Vanda chlorosantha (Garay) Christenson (Bhutan)
Vanda christensoniana (Haager) L.M.Gardiner
Vanda coerulea Griff. ex Lindl. "Blue Orchid" (Assam to China - S. Yunnan)
Vanda coerulescens Griff. (Arunachal Pradesh to China - S. Yunnan)
Vanda concolor Blume (S. China to Vietnam)
Vanda cootesii Motes
Vanda crassiloba Teijsm. & Binn. ex J.J.Sm.
Vanda cristata Wall. ex Lindl. (Himalaya to China - NW. Yunnan)
Vanda curvifolia (Lindl.) L.M.Gardiner
Vanda dearei Rchb.f. (Borneo)
Vanda denisoniana Benson & Rchb.f. (China - Yunnan to N. Indo-China)
Vanda devoogtii J.J.Sm. (Sulawesi)
Vanda dives (Rchb.f.) L.M.Gardiner (Vietnam, Laos)
Vanda falcata (Thunb.) Beer (Japan, China, Korea)
Vanda × feliciae Cootes
Vanda flabellata  (Rolfe ex Downie) Christenson, 1985 
Vanda foetida J.J.Sm. (S. Sumatra)
Vanda frankieana Metusala & P.O'Byrne
Vanda funingensis L.H.Zou & Z.J.Liu
Vanda furva (L.) Lindl. (Java, Maluku)
Vanda fuscoviridis Lindl. (S. China to Vietnam)
Vanda garayi (Christenson) L.M.Gardiner
Vanda gibbsiae Rolfe
Vanda gracilis Aver.
Vanda griffithii Lindl. (E. Himalaya)
Vanda hastifera Rchb.f. (Borneo)
Vanda helvola Blume (W. Malaysia to Philippines)
Vanda hienii (Aver. & V.C.Nguyen) R.Rice
Vanda hindsii Lindl. (Papuasia to N. Queensland)
Vanda insignis Blume ex Lindl. (Lesser Sunda Is.)
Vanda insularum (Christenson) L.M.Gardiner
Vanda jainii A.S.Chauhan (Assam)
Vanda javierae D.Tiu ex Fessel & Lückel (Philippines - Luzon)
Vanda jennae  P.O'Byrne & J.J.Verm., 2005 
Vanda lamellata Lindl. (Taiwan, Philippines, Sabah)
Vanda lamellata var. boxallii
Vanda lamellata var. lamellata
Vanda lamellata var. remediosae
Vanda lilacina Teijsm. & Binn. (China - Yunnan to Indo-China)
Vanda limbata Blume (Java, Lesser Sunda Is., Philippines - Mindanao)
Vanda lindenii Rchb.f.
Vanda liouvillei Finet (Assam to Indo-China)
Vanda lombokensis J.J.Sm. (Lesser Sunda Is.)
Vanda longitepala D.L.Roberts, L.M.Gardiner & Motes
Vanda luzonica Loher ex Rolfe (Philippines - Luzon)
Vanda malipoensis L.H.Zou, Jiu X.Huang & Z.J.Liu
Vanda mariae Motes
Vanda merrillii Ames & Quisumb. (Philippines)
Vanda metusalae  P.O'Byrne & J.J.Verm. (2008) 
Vanda mindanoensis Motes, L.M.Gardiner & D.L.Roberts
Vanda miniata (Lindl.) L.M.Gardiner
Vanda motesiana Choltco
Vanda nana L.M.Gardiner
Vanda perplexa Motes & D.L.Roberts
Vanda petersiana Schltr. (Myanmar)
Vanda pumila Hook.f. (Nepal to Hainan and N. Sumatra)
Vanda punctata Ridl. (Pen. Malaysia)
Vanda richardsiana (Christenson) L.M.Gardiner
Vanda roeblingiana Rolfe (Philippines - Luzon)
Vanda rubra (Lindl.) L.M.Gardiner
Vanda sanderiana (Rchb.f.) Rchb.f.
Vanda saxatilis J.J.Sm.
Vanda scandens Holttum (Borneo, Philippines - Mindanao)
Vanda stangeana Rchb.f. (India - Arunachal Pradesh to Assam)
Vanda subconcolor Tang & F.T.Wang (China - SW. Yunnan to Hainan)
Vanda sumatrana Schltr. (Sumatra)
Vanda tessellata (Roxb.) Hook. ex G.Don (Indian subcontinent to Indo-China)
Vanda testacea (Lindl.) Rchb.f. (Indian subcontinent to SC. China).
Vanda thwaitesii Hook.f. (S. India, Sri Lanka)
Vanda tricolor Lindl. (Laos, Java, Bali)
Vanda tricolor var. suavis
Vanda tricolor var. tricolor
Vanda ustii Golamco, Claustro & de Mesa (Philippines - Luzon)
Vanda vietnamica (Haager) L.M.Gardiner
Vanda vipanii Rchb.f. (Myanmar)
Vanda wightii Rchb.f. (S. India)
Vanda xichangensis (Z.J.Liu & S.C.Chen) L.M.Gardiner

Natural hybrids 
Vanda × boumaniae (V. insignis × V. limbata) (Lesser Sunda Is.)
Vanda × charlesworthii (V. bensonii × V. coerulea) (Myanmar)
Vanda × confusa (V. coerulescens × V. lilacina) (Myanmar)
Vanda × hebraica (V. denisoniana × V. brunnea) (Myanmar)

Intergeneric hybrids 

The following is a list of hybrid genera (nothogenera) in which hybrids vandas with orchids of other genera are placed although many of these are invalid because of recent taxonomic changes. For instance, × Ascocenda (Ascocentrum x Vanda) and × Vandofinetia (Vanda x Neofinetia) are no longer valid because both Ascocentrum and Neofinetia have been reduced to synonyms of Vanda by RHS, which is in charge of the International Orchid Register:
 
 × Aeridovanda (Aerides × Vanda)
 × Aeridovanisia (Aerides × Luisia × Vanda)
 × Alphonsoara (Arachnis × Ascocentrum × Vanda × Vandopsis)
 × Andrewara (Arachnis × Renanthera × Trichoglottis × Vanda)
 × Aranda (Arachnis × Vanda)
 × Ascocenda (Ascocentrum × Vanda)
 × Ascovandoritis (Ascocentrum × Doritis × Vanda)
 × Bokchoonara (Arachnis × Ascocentrum × Phalaenopsis × Vanda)
 × Bovornara (Arachnis × Ascocentrum × Rhynchostylis × Vanda)
 × Burkillara (Aerides × Arachnis × Vanda)
 × Charlieara (Rhynchostylis × Vanda × Vandopsis)
 × Christieara (Aerides × Ascocentrum × Vanda)
 × Darwinara (Ascocentrum × Neofinetia × Rhynchostylis × Vanda)
 × Debruyneara (Ascocentrum × Luisia × Vanda)
 × Devereuxara (Ascocentrum × Phalaenopsis × Vanda)
 × Eastonara (Ascocentrum × Gastrochilus × Vanda)
 × Fujiora (Ascocentrum × Trichoglottis × Vanda)
 × Goffara (Luisia × Rhynchostylis × Vanda)
 × Hawaiiara (Renanthera × Vanda × Vandopsis)
 × Hagerara (Doritis × Phalaenopsis × Vanda)
 × Himoriara (Ascocentrum × Phalaenopsis × Rhynchostylis × Vanda)
 × Holttumara (Arachnis × Renanthera × Vanda)
 × Isaoara (Aerides × Ascocentrum × Phalaenopsis × Vanda)
 × Joannara (Renanthera × Rhynchostylis × Vanda)
 × Kagawara (Ascocentrum × Renanthera × Vanda)
 × Knappara (Ascocentrum × Rhynchostylis × Vanda × Vandopsis)
 × Knudsonara (Ascocentrum × Neofinetia × Renanthera × Rhynchostylis × Vanda)
 × Leeara (Arachnis × Vanda × Vandopsis)
 × Luisanda (Luisia × Vanda)
 × Luivanetia (Luisia × Neofinetia × Vanda)
 × Lewisara (Aerides × Arachnis × Ascocentrum × Vanda)
 × Maccoyara (Aerides × Vanda × Vandopsis)
 × Macekara (Arachnis × Phalaenopsis × Renanthera × Vanda × Vandopsis)
 × Micholitzara (Aerides × Ascocentrum × Neofinetia × Vanda)
 × Moirara (Phalaenopsis × Renanthera × Vanda)
 × Mokara (Arachnis × Ascocentrum × Vanda)
 × Nakamotoara (Ascocentrum × Neofinetia × Vanda)
 × Nobleara (Aerides × Renanthera × Vanda)
 × Okaara (Ascocentrum × Renanthera × Rhynchostylis × Vanda)
 × Onoara (Ascocentrum × Renanthera × Vanda × Vandopsis)
 × Opsisanda (Vanda × Vandopsis)
 × Pageara (Ascocentrum × Luisia × Rhynchostylis × Vanda)
 × Pantapaara (Ascoglossum × Renanthera × Vanda)
 × Paulara (Ascocentrum × Doritis × Phalaenopsis × Renanthera × Vanda)
 × Pehara (Aerides × Arachnis × Vanda × Vandopsis)
 × Pereiraara (Aerides × Rhynchostylis × Vanda)
 × Phalaerianda (Aerides × Phalaenopsis × Vanda)
 × Raganara (Renanthera × Trichoglottis × Vanda)
 × Ramasamyara (Arachnis × Rhynchostylis × Vanda)
 × Renafinanda (Neofinetia × Renanthera × Vanda)
 × Renanda (Arachnis × Renanthera × Vanda)
 × Renantanda (Renanthera × Vanda)
 × Rhynchovanda (Rhynchostylis × Vanda)
 × Ridleyare (Arachnis × Trichoglottis × Vanda)
 × Robinaria (Aerides × Ascocentrum × Renanthera × Vanda)
 × Ronnyara (Aerides × Ascocentrum × Rhynchostylis × Vanda)
 × Sanjumeara (Aerides × Neofinetia × Rhynchostylis × Vanda)
 × Sarcovanda (Sarcochilus × Vanda)
 × Shigeuraara (Ascocentrum × Ascoglossum × Renanthera × Vanda)
 × Stamariaara (Ascocentrum × Phalaenopsis × Renanthera × Vanda)
 × Sutingara (Arachnis × Ascocentrum × Phalaenopsis × Vanda × Vandopsis)
 × Teohara (Arachnis × Renanthera × Vanda × Vandopsis)
 × Trevorara (Arachnis × Phalaenopsis × Vanda)
 × Trichovanda (Trichoglottis × Vanda)
 × Vascostylis (Ascocentrum × Rhynchostylis × Vanda)
 × Vandachnis (Arachnis × Vandopsis)
 × Vancampe (Acampe × Vanda)
 × Vandachostylis (Rhynchostylis × Vanda)
 × Vandaenopsis (Phalaenopsis × Vanda)
 × Vandaeranthes (Aeranthes × Vanda)
 × Vandewegheara (Ascocentrum × Doritis × Phalaenopsis × Vanda)
 × Vandofinetia (Neofinetia × Vanda)
 × Vandofinides (Aerides × Neofinetia × Vanda)
 × Vandoritis (Doritis × Vanda)
 × Vanglossum (Ascoglossum × Vanda)
 × Wilkinsara (Ascocentrum × Vanda × Vandopsis)
 × Yapara (Phalaenopsis × Rhynchostylis × Vanda)
 × Yusofara (Arachnis × Ascocentrum × Renanthera × Vanda)
 × Yonezawaara (Neofinetia × Rhynchostylis × Vanda)

References

Further reading 
 Grove, D. L. 1995. Vandas and Ascocendas. Timber Press, Portland, Oregon. 241 pp.
 Motes, Martin R., and Alan L. Hoffman. 1997 Vandas, Their botany, history and culture.

External links 

 Vanda Miss Joaquim

 
Vandeae genera
Epiphytic orchids